Cygany  is a village in the administrative district of Gmina Obryte, within Pułtusk County, Masovian Voivodeship, in east-central Poland.

References

Cygany